UY or uy may refer to:Places:
 Uruguay (ISO 3166-1 country code UY)
 Upper Yukon region, Canada
 Uy (Irtysh), a tributary of the Irtysh in Russia
 Uy (Tobol), a tributary of the Tobol in RussiaOther uses''':
 Uy (surname)
 .uy, the country code top level domain (ccTLD) for Uruguay
 Cameroon Airlines (IATA code UY)
 University of Yangon, Myanmar
 University of Yuryev, Estonia (today University of Tartu)
 Urusei Yatsura'', a Japanese manga and anime series